The Tasman Island Group is a group of islands near the Tasman Peninsula in south-east Tasmania, Australia.

The islands in this group lie within Tasman National Park, and they include Clydes Island, Dart Island, Tasman Island, The Lanterns and Wedge Island.

See also

 List of islands of Tasmania

References

Islands of Tasmania
Tasman National Park
Tasman Sea
Protected areas of Tasmania
Important Bird Areas of Tasmania